The Outer Limits is an American television series that was broadcast on ABC from September 16, 1963, to January 16, 1965, at 7:30 PM Eastern Time on Mondays. It is often compared to The Twilight Zone, but with a greater emphasis on science fiction stories (rather than stories of fantasy or the supernatural). It is an anthology of self-contained episodes, sometimes with plot twists at their ends.

In 1997, the episode "The Zanti Misfits" was ranked #98 on TV Guide's 100 Greatest Episodes of All Time.

It was revived in 1995, until its cancellation in 2002. 

In April 2019, a new revival was stated to be in development at a premium cable network.

Overview

Introduction
Each show began with either a cold open or a preview clip, followed by a narration over visuals of an oscilloscope. Using an Orwellian theme of taking over your television, the earliest version of the narration was:

A similar but shorter monologue caps each episode: 

Later episodes used one of two shortened versions of the introduction. The first few episodes began simply with the title screen followed by the narration and no cold open or preview clip. The Control Voice was performed by actor Vic Perrin.

Production

The Outer Limits was originally broadcast on the American television network ABC (1963–65). 49 episodes were produced. It was one of many series influenced by The Twilight Zone and Science Fiction Theatre, though it ultimately proved influential in its own right. In the unaired pilot, it was called Please Stand By, but ABC rejected that title. Series creator Leslie Stevens retitled it The Outer Limits. With a few changes, the pilot aired as the premiere episode, "The Galaxy Being".

Writers included creator Stevens and Joseph Stefano (screenwriter of the film Psycho), who was the Season 1 producer and creative guiding force, and who wrote more of the series' episodes than anyone. Future Oscar-winning screenwriter Robert Towne (Chinatown) wrote "The Chameleon", the final Season 1 episode. A pair of Season 2 episodes, "Soldier" and "Demon with a Glass Hand", were written by Harlan Ellison. The latter won a Writers' Guild Award.

Writer Joseph Stefano was recruited in a late night phone call from Leslie Stevens; the two men had known each other for years. Stevens met him with composer/producer Dominic Frontiere and pitched the series to him asking him to come on as a writer and producer. Stefano, who had never produced before, felt reassured by Associate Producer Robert Justman to support him as Justman had experience in TV.

Season 1 combined science fiction and horror, while Season 2 was more focused on 'hard science fiction' stories, dropping the recurring "scary monster" motif of Season 1. Each episode in Season 1 was to have a monster or creature as a critical part of the story line in a villain of the week format. Season 1 writer and producer Joseph Stefano believed this element was necessary to provide fear, suspense, or at least a center for plot development. This kind of story element became known as "the bear". This device was, however, mostly dropped in Season 2 after Stefano left.

Two Season 1 episodes without a "bear" are "The Forms of Things Unknown" and "Controlled Experiment", the first of which was shot in a dual format as science fiction for The Outer Limits and as a thriller for a pilot for an unmade series, The Unknown. Actor Barry Morse, who starred in "Controlled Experiment", states that it was made as a pilot for an unrealized science fiction/comedy series. It was the only comedic episode of The Outer Limits.

Earlier Season 1 episodes with no "bear" were "The Hundred Days of the Dragon" and "The Borderland", made before the "bear" convention was established. Season 2 episodes with a "bear" are "Keeper of the Purple Twilight", "The Duplicate Man", and "The Probe". "Bears" appear near the conclusion of the Season 2 episodes "Counterweight", "The Invisible Enemy", and "Cold Hands, Warm Heart".) The "bear" in "The Architects of Fear", the monstrously altered Allen Leighton, was judged by some of ABC's local affiliate stations to be so frightening that they broadcast a black screen during the "Thetan's" appearances, effectively censoring most of the show's last act. In other parts of the United States, the "Thetan" footage was tape-delayed until after the 11pm/10c news. In others, it was not shown at all.

The series was shot at KTTV (Metromedia Square) on sound stage # 2.
Season 1 had music by Dominic Frontiere, who doubled as Production Executive; Season 2 featured music by Harry Lubin, with a variation of his Fear theme for One Step Beyond being heard over the end titles.

Cinematography
The program sometimes made use of techniques (lighting, camerawork, even make-up) associated with film noir or German Expressionism (see for example, "Corpus Earthling"). Credit for this is often given to the cinematographer Conrad Hall, who later won three Academy Awards for his work in motion pictures. However, Hall worked only on alternate episodes of this TV series during the first two-thirds of the first season. The program's other cinematographers included John M. Nickolaus and Kenneth Peach.

Special effects
Season 1's monsters and creatures, and most props, were developed by a loose-knit group under the name Project Unlimited, whose members included Wah Chang, Gene Warren and Jim Danforth. Makeup effects were by Fred B. Phillips and John Chambers.

Characters and models
Many of the creatures that appeared in Outer Limits episodes were sold as models and action figures in the 1990s and 2000s. Limited-editions model kits, to be assembled and painted by the purchaser, were issued by Dimensional Designs. A smaller set of out-of-the-box action figures were sold in larger quantity by Sideshow Toys. The former produced a model kit of The Megasoid from "The Duplicate Man", and both created a figure of Gwyllm as an evolved man from "The Sixth Finger".

Reception and reputation
The series earned a loyal audience in its first season. Some viewers were reported to take TV sets with them if they had to be away from home, so they wouldn't miss an episode. However, the second season fared rather poorly in the Nielsen ratings after moving from Monday to Saturday night, where it competed with Jackie Gleason. Producer Joseph Stefano chose to leave the show after the first year; he realized that competing with the more popular Gleason would kill his show (proven by its cancellation midway through the second season). However, the series retained a following for many years after its original broadcast. Many decades later, horror writer Stephen King described it as one of the best programs of its type to run on network TV.

Originally scheduled to air on November 25, 1963, the episode "Nightmare" was delayed until December 2 due to television coverage of the state funeral of President John F. Kennedy.

Comparison to The Twilight Zone
Like The Twilight Zone, The Outer Limits had an opening and closing narration in almost every episode. Both shows were unusually philosophical for science fiction anthology series, but differed in style. The Twilight Zone stories were often like parables, employing whimsy (such as the Buster Keaton time-travel episode "Once Upon a Time"), irony, or extraordinary problem-solving situations (such as the episode "The Arrival"). The Outer Limits was usually a straight action-and-suspense show which often had the human spirit in confrontation with dark existential forces from within or without, such as in the alien abduction episode "A Feasibility Study" or the alien possession story "The Invisibles".  The Outer Limits was also known for the moody, textured look of many episodes (especially those directed by Byron Haskin or Gerd Oswald, or photographed by Conrad Hall) whereas The Twilight Zone tended to be shot more conventionally.

There is common ground between some of the shows' episodes. As Schow and Frentzen, authors of The Outer Limits: The Official Companion, have noted, several Outer Limits episodes are often misremembered by casual fans as Twilight Zone episodes—notably, "problem-solving" episodes such as "Fun and Games" and "The Premonition".

Legacy

Influence on Star Trek
A few of the monsters from The Outer Limits reappeared in Gene Roddenberry's Star Trek series later in the 1960s. The moving microbe beast in "The Probe" was modified and used as the 'Horta' in "The Devil in the Dark", operated by the same actor, Janos Prohaska. The "ion storm" from "The Mutant" (a projector beam shining through a container containing glitter in liquid suspension) became the transporter effect in Star Trek. The black mask from "The Duplicate Man" was used by the character Dr. Leighton in "The Conscience of the King". The Megasoid from "The Duplicate Man" and the Empyrean from "Second Chance" (1964) were briefly seen near Captain Christopher Pike in other cages in the Star Trek pilot "The Cage". The process used to make pointed ears for David McCallum in "The Sixth Finger" was reused in Star Trek as well. 

Lead actors who later appeared in Star Trek's regular cast included Leonard Nimoy, who appeared in two Outer Limits episodes ("Production and Decay of Strange Particles" and "I, Robot"); and William Shatner, who appeared in the episode "Cold Hands, Warm Heart" as an astronaut working on a Project Vulcan. Other actors who subsequently appeared on Star Trek were Grace Lee Whitney (episode "Controlled Experiment") and James Doohan (episode "Expanding Human"). Roddenberry was often present in The Outer Limits studios, and hired several of its staff, including Robert Justman and Wah Chang, for Star Trek. Michael Ansara, who appeared in the Outer Limits episode "Soldier", guest-starred as Klingon commander Kang in the original and spin-off Star Trek series. Arlene Martel, who appeared in the Outer Limits episode "Demon with a Glass Hand", guest-starred as Spock's Vulcan bride, T'Pring, in the Star Trek original series episode "Amok Time".

Lawsuit on behalf of Harlan Ellison
Harlan Ellison contended that inspiration for James Cameron's The Terminator (1984) came in part from Ellison's work on The Outer Limits. Cameron conceded the influence, and Ellison was awarded money and an end-credits mention in The Terminator (1984), stating the creators' wish of "acknowledgement to the works of Harlan Ellison". Cameron was against Orion's decision and was told that if he did not agree with the settlement, they would have Cameron pay for any damages if Orion lost Ellison's suit. Cameron replied that he "had no choice but to agree with the settlement. There was a gag order as well."

Film adaptation projects
Filmmaker Kevin Smith has stated that, before offering him the chance to write Superman Lives in 1996, Warner Bros. offered him two projects: a remake of The Architects of Fear and Beetlejuice Goes Hawaiian. In 2001, MGM made plans with Mark Victor and Michael Grais to produce a film adaptation of The Outer Limits. Development began a year later with Gerald Di Pego co-writing with his sons Justin and Zachary, and Rupert Wainwright directing. A new adaptation was developed in 2010, with Patrick Melton and Marcus Dunstan writing and Jonathan Shestack producing. On June 20, 2014, The Hollywood Reporter said Metro-Goldwyn-Mayer was developing a film version of The Outer Limits based on the "Demon with a Glass Hand" episode, with Scott Derrickson and C. Robert Cargill writing and Mark Victor producing. On April 1, 2019, Variety reported that an Outer Limits reboot was in development at a premium cable network.

In popular culture
Steve Streeter published The Outer Limits Newsletter from 1978 to 1983 and founded the Outer Limits Fan Club in 1978.

Lyrics to the title song of the 1989 film UHF, written by and starring "Weird Al" Yankovic, references The Outer Limits cold-open narration:
Don't you know that we control the horizontal
We control the vertical, too
In the 2018 animated film the Incredibles 2 the opening scene from The Outer Limits is briefly shown in on a television screen. It is hinted that the film is set in the year 1963, when The Outer Limits first aired.

Episodes

Home media

VHS release
A "platinum" version of the MGM/UA Library brand product of the video series was released.

DVD releases
MGM Home Entertainment has released both seasons of The Outer Limits on DVD in Region 1. In 2007, they re-released the series in three separate sets. In October 2008, MGM released a 7-disc box set featuring all 49 episodes of the series. The re-releases of Season 2 correctly claim three discs in the set on the outer packaging, whereas the individual slim cases with the DVDs inside rather confusingly claim only two.

The DVDs include a revised version of the original intro, heard over the episode menus:

 The episodes "The Invisible Enemy" and "Wolf 359" are erroneously listed on one DVD case ("The Outer Limits Volume Three The Original Series Disc 1 Episodes 33–40") in "The Outer Limits The Complete Original Series Volumes 1–3". Both episodes are actually only on Disc 2 included in the case for "The Outer Limits Volume Three The Original Series Discs 2–3 Episodes 39–49".

Blu-ray release

On 27 March 2018, Kino Lorber released the first season on Blu-ray. The 7-disc set contains the 32 episodes of the first season. The second season was released 20 November 2018, but the episode "Soldier" had audio defects. A replacement disc was sent out from Kino in April 2019.

On Jun 24, 2020, Australia's Via Vision Entertainment released The Outer Limits: Complete Original Series Collector's Edition 11-disc Blu-ray set. It's coded for region B and comes in a hard box case with a 60-page Illustrated booklet, with essays by leading Outer Limits expert and author David J. Schow.

See also

 The Outer Limits (1995 TV series)
 List of The Outer Limits (1995 TV series) episodes
 Science fiction on television

Similar TV series

 13 Demon Street
 Alcoa Presents: One Step Beyond
 Amazing Stories
 Are You Afraid of the Dark?
 Black Mirror
 Darkroom
 Fear Itself
 Goosebumps
 Masters of Horror
 Masters of Science Fiction
 Monsters
 Night Gallery
 Out of the Unknown
 Out of This World
 Science Fiction Theatre
 Tales from the Crypt
 Tales from the Darkside
 Tales of Tomorrow
 The Hitchhiker (TV series)
 The Ray Bradbury Theater
 The Twilight Zone (1959 TV series)
 The Twilight Zone (1985 TV series)
 The Twilight Zone (2002 TV series)
 The Twilight Zone (2019 TV series)
 The Veil
 Thriller
 Ultra Q
 Way Out
 Welcome to Paradox

Other articles
 Outer Limits Galaxy

References

External links

 We Are Controlling Transmission -- a blog about The Outer Limits
 Outer Limits Fan Site
 The Outer Limits with episode list at CVTA
Joseph Stefano interviewed by Lee Weinstein

1960s American science fiction television series
1963 American television series debuts
1965 American television series endings
1960s American anthology television series
American Broadcasting Company original programming
Television series about alien visitations
Television series set in fictional countries
Black-and-white American television shows
English-language television shows
American horror fiction television series
Space adventure television series
Television series by United Artists Television
Science fiction anthology television series
Science fiction franchises
The Twilight Zone